Peter Outerbridge (born June 30, 1966) is a Canadian actor, best known for his role as Ari Tasarov in the CW action series Nikita, Dr. David Sandström in the TMN series ReGenesis, Henrik "Hank" Johanssen in Orphan Black, Bob Corbett in Bomb Girls, William Easton in Saw VI, George Brown in the television film John A.: Birth of a Country, and Black Mask in Batwoman. He also played the lead role of Detective William Murdoch in a three-episode mini-series, The Murdoch Mysteries, in its initial run on Canadian television, with two episodes shown in 2004 and a third in 2005.

Early life
Outerbridge was born and raised in Toronto, Ontario, the son of a lawyer and youngest of five siblings.

Career
After high school Outerbridge enrolled at the University of Victoria to study acting. Afterwards he toured Canada for four years with the theatre group Way Off Broadway. In 1997 and 2002 he was nominated in the Canadian Genie Awards as the best actor in the films Kissed and Marine Life, respectively. He was also nominated in the Gemini Awards for his achievements. Outerbridge won a 2013 Canadian Screen Award for Best Performance by an Actor in a Featured Supporting Role in a Dramatic Program or Series for his role in John A.: Birth of a Country.

In May 2000, he married actress Tammy Isbell. Together they have twins, Samuel and Thomas (born 2004).

Outerbridge had a recurring role in the second season of Orphan Black, portraying the character Henrik "Hank" Johanssen, a Prolethean religious leader who is against the scientific processes that created the clones.

In 2021, Outerbridge recurred in the second season of Batwoman as Black Mask.

Filmography

Film

Television

Video games

Voice work

References

External links 
 
 
 ReGenesis PeterOuterbridge NorthernStars (Germ./Engl.)
 peterouterbridge.net – a Peter Outerbridge fansite
 Peter Outerbridge-themed Tumblr
 Peter Outerbridge Message Board

1966 births
Living people
Canadian male film actors
Canadian male television actors
Canadian male voice actors
Male actors from Toronto
20th-century Canadian male actors
21st-century Canadian male actors
Best Supporting Actor in a Drama Series Canadian Screen Award winners